First Baptist Church of Raleigh is located in downtown Raleigh, North Carolina. The church was the first Baptist church in the city of Raleigh, organized in 1812, and is one of the oldest churches in the area. The church is located on 99 North Salisbury Street, directly across the street from the Capitol. First Baptist Church is affiliated with the Cooperative Baptist Fellowship (CBF).

The Church began in 1812 with 23 members, 14 of whom were "Negro slaves."  By 1826 there were 157 black members, and 77 white members.  In 1866 the 200 Negro members organized a church of their own, while the 226 white members stayed at First Baptist.

References

Baptist churches in North Carolina
Churches in Raleigh, North Carolina
Churches on the National Register of Historic Places in North Carolina
National Register of Historic Places in Wake County, North Carolina